Maria Raha (born 1972) is an American author and rock journalist from New York. She graduated from Ithaca College.

She specializes in the American rock underground. She has worked for major music publications such as Vibe and Spin as well as magazines like Bitch: Feminist Response to Pop Culture.

She also contributed to the anthology "Young Wives' Tales : New Adventures in Love and Partnership" with the short story "Pillow Talk" (2001), and "The W Effect: Bush's War on Women", Feminist Press, (2004).

In 2005, she released the book Cinderella's Big Score: Women of the Punk and Indie Underground. The book was published by Seal Press.

Raha is managing editor of Swingset, an art and music journal based in New York City. She currently lives in Philadelphia, PA.

References
Gothamist Interview, 2005

1972 births
Living people
American women writers
American women journalists
American feminists
21st-century American journalists
21st-century American women